Pyrausta insequalis, the mottled pyrausta moth, is a moth in the family Crambidae. It was described by Achille Guenée in 1854. It is found in United States, Mexico and Canada. Adults have been recorded on wing from March to November.

References

insequalis
Moths of North America
Moths described in 1854